Bad Romeo is a Thai romantic drama television series, produced by Thong Entertainment Company Limited by Anne Thongprasom from the director of Nonzee Nimibutr in the beginning and Ampaiporn Jitmai-ngong in the latter part. The show was broadcast on Channel 3 HD and was written by Danaya Supying. It stars Mario Maurer and Urassaya Sperbund. It first aired on 20 July 2022, and is available for streaming on Netflix.

Cast

Main cast 
 Mario Maurer as Kaokhla
 Urassaya Sperbund as Saikhim
 Thatchathorn Sap-anant as Thanthai
 Chutimon Chuengcharoensukying as Lita
 Yuranunt Pamornmontri as Songsilp

Cameo cast 
 Nam-nguen Boonnak as Nam-thong

Production 
In June 2020, Anne Thongprasom as the drama's producer published images of Mario Maurer and Urassaya Sperbund as the protagonist and heroine of this drama on her personal Instagram, and announced the name of the drama is Bad Romeo.

Due to the COVID-19 pandemic in Thailand, the production of this drama was delayed and took more than 2 years to film.

International broadcast 
 In the Philippines, Bad Romeo premiered on GMA Network's The Heart of Asia programming block on 16 January 2022, dubbed in Filipino.

References 

Thai romantic drama television series
Channel 3 (Thailand) original programming
2022 Thai television series debuts
2022 Thai television series endings